Henry Dobson (24 December 1841 – 10 October 1918) was an Australian politician, who served as a member of the Tasmanian House of Assembly and later of the Australian Senate. He was the 17th Premier of Tasmania from 17 August 1892 to 14 April 1894.

Early life and legal career
Dobson was born in Hobart Town, Van Diemen's Land (now Tasmania), the son of John Dobson and full brother to Alfred and half-brother to William Lambert Dobson, and Frank Dobson. Dobson was educated at The Hutchins School and worked for a merchant firm before commencing legal training with Allport, Robson & Allport. He was admitted to the Tasmanian Bar in 1846, and partnered with William Giblin from 1865 to 1870, and was a senior partner in the law firm Dobson, Mitchell & Allport (started by his father).

Political career

Tasmanian House of Assembly
Dobson's political career began on 12 August 1891, when he was elected to the Tasmanian House of Assembly representing the electorate of Brighton. He was quickly made Leader of the Opposition the next month, and became Premier of Tasmania on 17 August 1892 after the fall of Philip Fysh's government.

Dobson had a keen interest in education, and introduced compulsory education legislation into the Tasmanian parliament. He also promoted Tasmania as a tourist destination and fruit-growing centre, attributes which it remains known for today. Economic factors required him to make difficult decisions, and when a proposed retrenchment program was rejected in the Parliament, Dobson obtained a dissolution from the Governor, and then resigned as Premier on 14 April 1894 when the situation remained unchanged after the election.

After retiring as Premier, Dobson remained in his seat until he retired on 9 March 1900.

Australian Senate
Dobson was a keen supporter of the Federation of Australia, and when federation took place in 1901, Dobson was elected as a member of the first Australian Senate for Tasmania. He remained in the Senate for over nine years, but retired when he lost the election on 30 June 1910. He served as Chairman of Committees from 1908 to 1910.

Later life
After retiring from politics, Dobson turned his efforts to promoting Tasmanian tourism. He founded and was president of the Tasmanian Tourist Association from 1893, helped found the Tourist and Information Bureau and the Scenery Preservation Board in 1915, and was chairman of the National Park Board from 1917 to 1918.

Dobson died on 10 October 1918 in Hobart.

References

 

1841 births
1918 deaths
Premiers of Tasmania
Members of the Tasmanian House of Assembly
Members of the Australian Senate
Members of the Australian Senate for Tasmania
19th-century Australian lawyers
Politicians from Hobart
Leaders of the Opposition in Tasmania
Free Trade Party members of the Parliament of Australia
Revenue Tariff Party members of the Parliament of Australia
Commonwealth Liberal Party members of the Parliament of Australia
19th-century Australian politicians
20th-century Australian politicians